Taman Wahyu is a residential area in Kampung Batu, Kuala Lumpur, Malaysia. The main inhabitants are Chinese. A Chinese primary school is located about 1.5 kilometers from Taman Wahyu. There are also several coffee shops and a Chinese traditional herb store.

Transportation
Taman Wahyu KTM Komuter Station

Entertainment
Every Friday, a night market is held at Taman Wahyu.

Suburbs in Kuala Lumpur